KTLT (98.1 FM) is a commercial radio station licensed to Anson, Texas, broadcasting to the Abilene, Texas area. KTLT airs an active rock format branded as "98.1 The Phantom". Studios are located along U.S. Highway 84 in southwest Abilene, and the transmitter site is in between Anson and Hawley, Texas along U.S. Highway 277 in Jones County.

History
On April 29, 2007, KTLT ceased broadcasting a Christian contemporary music format in favor of modern rock.

On September 13, 2010, KTLT changed their format from modern rock to sports, branded as "The Ticket", with programming from ESPN Radio. In January 2013, KTLT switched affiliations to CBS Sports Radio.

On January 15, 2021 at 12 midnight, KTLT changed their format from sports to active rock, branded as "98.1 The Phantom".

References

External links

Active rock radio stations in the United States
TLT
Radio stations established in 1989
1989 establishments in Texas
Cumulus Media radio stations